Ubiquitin-specific-processing protease 7 (USP7), also known as ubiquitin carboxyl-terminal hydrolase 7 or herpesvirus-associated ubiquitin-specific protease (HAUSP), is an enzyme that in humans is encoded by the USP7 gene.

Function

Regulation of the p53 tumor suppressor 

USP7 or HAUSP is a ubiquitin specific protease or a deubiquitylating enzyme that cleaves ubiquitin from its substrates.  Since ubiquitylation (polyubiquitination) is most commonly associated with the stability and degradation of cellular proteins, HAUSP activity generally stabilizes its substrate proteins.

HAUSP is most popularly known as a direct antagonist of Mdm2, the E3 ubiquitin ligase for the tumor suppressor protein, p53.  Normally, p53 levels are kept low in part due to Mdm2-mediated ubiquitylation and degradation of p53.  In response to oncogenic insults, HAUSP can deubiquitinate p53 and protect p53 from Mdm2-mediated degradation, indicating that it may possess a tumor suppressor function for the immediate stabilization of p53 in response to stress.

Another important role of HAUSP function involves the oncogenic stabilization of p53. Oncogenes such as Myc and E1A are thought to activate p53 through a p19 alternative reading frame (p19ARF, also called ARF)-dependent pathway, although some evidence suggests ARF is not essential in this process. A possibility is that HAUSP provides an alternative pathway for safeguarding the cell against oncogenic insults.

Role in transcriptional regulation 

USP7 can deubiquitinate histone H2B and this activity is associated with gene silencing in Drosophila.  USP7 associates with a metabolic enzyme, GMP synthetase (GMPS) and this association stimulates USP7 deubiquitinase activity towards H2B.  The USP7-GMPS complex is recruited to the polycomb (Pc) region in Drosophila and contributes to epigenetic silencing of homeotic genes.

Association with herpesviruses

USP7 was originally identified as a protein associated with the ICP0 protein of herpes simplex virus (HSV), hence the name Herpesvirus Associated USP (HAUSP).  ICP0 is an E3-ubiquitin ligase that is involved in ubiquitination and subsequent degradation of itself and certain cellular proteins.  USP7 has been shown to regulate the auto-ubiquitination and degradation of ICP0.

More recently, an interaction between USP7 and the EBNA1 protein of Epstein–Barr virus (EBV) (another herpesvirus) was also discovered.  This interaction is particularly interesting given the oncogenic potential (potential to cause cancer) of EBV, which is associated with several human cancers.  EBNA1 can compete with p53 for binding USP7.  Stabilization by USP7 is important for the tumor suppressor function of p53.  In cells, EBNA1 can sequester USP7 from p53 and thus attenuate stabilization of p53, rendering the cells predisposed to turning cancerous.  Compromising the function of p53 by sequestering USP7 is one way EBNA1 can contribute to the oncogenic potential of EBV.  Additionally, human USP7 was also shown to form a complex with GMPS and this complex is recruited to EBV genome sequences.  USP7 was shown to be important for histone H2B deubiquitination in human cells and for deubiquitination of histone H2B incorporated in the EBV genome.  Thus USP7 may also be important for regulation of viral gene expression.

The fact that viral proteins have evolved so as to target USP7, underscores the significance of USP7 in tumor suppression and other cellular processes.

Binding partners
The following is a list of some of the known cellular binding partners of USP7/HAUSP:

 p53
 Mdm2
 Mdm4/MdmX
 FOXO4
 Daxx
 PTEN
 March7
 UVSSA

Interactions 

USP7 has been shown to interact with Ataxin 1, CLSPN and P53. A proteomic screen conducted to identify interacting partners of 75 human deubiquitinating enzymes (DUBs) has revealed several novel binding partners of USP7.

Clinical significance 

Loss-of-function mutations of USP7 are associated with neurodevelopmental disorder whose symptoms include developmental delay/intellectual disability, autism spectrum disorder, increased prevalence of epilepsy, abnormal brain MRIs, and speech/motor impairments, with some patients being completely non-verbal,

USP7 can be used as a senolytic agent due to ubiquitination and subsequent proteasome degradation of mdm2, thereby increasing p53 activity.

References

Further reading

External links